Adam Kingwande (born 1 September 1989) is a retired Tanzanian football midfielder.

References

1989 births
Living people
Tanzanian footballers
Tanzania international footballers
Simba S.C. players
African Lyon F.C. players
Kagera Sugar F.C. players
Kinondoni Municipal Council F.C. players
Association football midfielders
Tanzanian expatriate footballers
Tanzanian Premier League players